The Lise Meitner Prize for nuclear physics, established in 2000, is awarded every two years by the European Physical Society for outstanding work in the fields of experimental, theoretical or applied nuclear science. It is named after Lise Meitner to honour her fundamental contributions to nuclear physics and her courageous and exemplary life.

Recipients 
 2020 Klaus Blaum, Björn Jonson, 
2018 , 
 2016 
 2014 Johanna Stachel, Paolo Giubellino, 
 2012 , Friedrich-Karl Thielemann
 2010 
 2008 Reinhard Stock, Walter Greiner
 2006 , David M. Brink
 2004 , Peter J. Twin
 2002 Phil Elliott, Francesco Iachello
 2000 Peter Armbruster, Gottfried Münzenberg, Yuri Oganessian

See also

 List of physics awards

References 

Awards of the European Physical Society
Nuclear physics